The 2019–20 All-Ireland Senior Club Football Championship  was the 50th staging of the All-Ireland Senior Club Football Championship since its establishment by the Gaelic Athletic Association in 1970-71. The championship began on 20 October 2019 and ended on 19 January 2020.

Corofin entered the championship as the defending champions.

On 19 January 2020, Corofin won the championship following a 1-12 to 0-07 defeat of Kilcoo in the All-Ireland final at Croke Park. It was their fifth championship title overall, while they also became the first team to win three successive championships.

Format

County Championships

All thirty two counties in Ireland and London play their county senior championships between their top gaelic football clubs. Each county decides the format for their county championship. The format can be straight knockout, double-elimination, a league, groups, etc. or a combination.

Only single club teams are allowed to enter the All-Ireland Club championship. If a team that is an amalgamation of two or more clubs, a divisional team or a university team wins a county's championship, a single club team will represent that county in the provincial championship as determined by that county's championship rules. Normally it is the club team that exited the championship at the highest stage.

Traditionally, the All-Ireland Club Championship Finals were held on St. Patrick's Day. The GAA decided to bring forward the Club Finals to 19 January 2020 with a view to completing the competition in the calendar year from 2021.

Provincial championships 
Connacht, Leinster, Munster and Ulster each organise a provincial championship for their participating county champions. The Kilkenny senior champions play in the Leinster Intermediate Club Football Championship. London continue to compete in the Connacht championship – in previous years they played one of the provincial champions in a single match in December referred to as a quarter-final.

All matches are knock-out. Two ten minute periods of extra time are played each way if it's a draw at the end of normal time in all matches including the final. If the score is still level after extra time the match is replayed.

All-Ireland 
In a bid to shorten the break between the provincial finals and the All-Ireland semi-finals, the two semi-finals between the four provincial champions will be played in early January – previously they were held in mid-February. Traditionally, the All-Ireland final was played in Croke Park on St. Patrick's Day, the 17th of March, but it has also been moved to 19 January 2020.

TV Coverage
TG4 continue to broadcast live and deferred club championship games each year.  Eir Sport entered the third year of their agreement to broadcast live Gaelic football and hurling club championship games, including county championships and provincial and All-Ireland club championship matches.
In addition to TG4 and eir Sport, RTÉ also broadcast games from the AIB Club Championships, which runs alongside TG4's coverage.

County Finals

Connacht

Galway SFC

Leitrim SFC

London SFC

Mayo SFC

Roscommon SFC

Sligo SFC

Leinster

Carlow SFC

Dublin SFC

Kildare SFC

Kilkenny SFC

The Kilkenny SFC champions take part in the Leinster Club Intermediate Football Championship.

Laois SFC

Longford SFC

Louth SFC

Meath SFC

Offaly SFC

Westmeath SFC

Wexford SFC

Wicklow SFC

Munster
Clare SFC

Cork SFC

Kerry SFC

Limerick SFC

Tipperary SFC

Waterford SFC

Ulster
Antrim SFC

Armagh SFC

Cavan SFC

Donegal SFC

Derry SFC

Down SFC

Fermanagh SFC

Monaghan SFC

Tyrone SFC

Provincial championships

Connacht

Quarter-finals

Semi-finals

Final

Leinster

Preliminary round

Quarter-finals

Semi-finals

Final

Munster

Quarter-finals

Semi-finals

Final

Ulster

Preliminary round

Quarter-finals

Semi-finals

Final

All-Ireland

Semi-finals

Final

References

All-Ireland Senior Club Football Championship
2019 GAA Football Club Championships